Koundara is a prefecture located in the Boké Region of Guinea. The capital is Koundara.

Capital
Koundara town is served by Sambailo Airport. As of 2014 it had a population of 27,433 people.

Sub-prefectures
The prefecture is divided administratively into 7 sub-prefectures:
 Koundara-Centre
 Guingan
 Kamaby
 Sambailo
 Saréboido
 Termesse
 Youkounkoun

References

Prefectures of Guinea
Boké Region